The 2015 AMF Futsal Men's World Cup was the 11th edition of the AMF Futsal World Cup. The tournament was held in Belarus from 17 to 25 April in the cities of Brest, Minsk, Pinsk, Maladzyechna and Barysaw. Sixteen national teams from all confederations participated in the tournament. Colombia won the tournament by defeating Paraguay 4–0 in the final, achieving its second consecutive title and third overall.

Venues
Matches were played in six venues across five cities: Brest, Minsk, Pinsk, Maladzyechna and Barysaw.

Participating teams
In addition to host nation Belarus, 15 nations qualified.

1.Teams that made their debut.

Squads

Group stage
The group winners and runners up advanced to the quarter-finals.

Group A

Group B

Group C

Group D

Knockout stage

Quarter-finals

Semi-finals

Third place play-off

Final

Top goalscorers

10 goals

  Darío Herrera
  Marcio Gentil

8 goals

  Camilo Gómez

7 goals

  Marcelo Mescolatti
  Steven Dillien
  Jhon Pinilla

6 goals

  Miguel Tapia
  Jorge Cuervo

5 goals

  Diego Abril

4 goals

  Hicham Channouf
  Thierry Djedje
  Afgan Rahmanov

3 goals

  Facundo Contreras
  Renzo Grasso
  Bilal El Merboh
  Antoine Lemaire
  Rafael Duran
  El Hafid Abdessamade
  Yassine Laaraj
  Yassine Qoli
  Thomas Lyngbø
  Jorge Espinoza
  Nicolás Saffe
  Éver Salinas
  Roman Senatorov

2 goals

  Mariano Cardone
  Matthew Hoole
  Grant Lynch
  Vladislav Seliuk
  Artiom Yakubov
  Julio César Feitosa
  Alejandro Dimas
  Andrés Murillo
  Miroslav Rott
  Martin Sop
  El Hammouchi Ammed
  Jørgen Bjelland
  Christian Ersland
  Óscar Cáceres
  Sergej Harin
  Mihail Zapletin
  Jakub Baranovič
  Mauricio Gianechini
  Humberto Moreno
  Énderson Suárez

1 goal

  Diego Koltes
  Gonzalo Pires
  Diego Vázquez
  Angelo De Brandt
  Soufiane Tigra
  Domien Vanderveck
  Alekséi Nalivaiko
  Dmitri Tesliuk
  Gustavo Camargo
  Leonardo Rocha
  John Celis
  Felipe Echavarría
  Cristofer Martínez
  Diego Castillo
  Luigino Hoyer
  Stallone Isenia
  Dannick Koeiman
  Jean Paulleta
  Tomáš Abrhám
  Tomáš Fichtner
  Daniar Abdraimov
  Adilet Kultaev
  Alovaen Ahmed
  Bilal Amin
  Anin Bilal
  El Farrousi Smail
  Alf Jakob Aano
  Andrej Chibirev
  Konstantin Markov
  Boris Vardanjan
  Anton Bahna
  Miloš Hubočan
  Michal Németh
  Vladimír Papajčík
  Jozef Pápež
  Libor Ťažký
  Elio Hernández
  Esteban Lorier
  Augusto Santos
  Leonardo Triunfo
  Marco Colina
  Robert Mena
  Carlos Méndez
  Roberto Ramos
  Paolo Sánchez

Tournament team rankings

|-
| colspan="11"| Eliminated in the quarter-finals
|-

|-
| colspan="11"| Eliminated in the group stage
|-

References

External links
Official website

AMF Futsal World Cup
2015 in futsal
International futsal competitions hosted by Belarus
2015 in Belarusian football